The Most Reverend Geoffrey David Hand KBE GCL (11 May 1918 – 6 April 2006) was an Australian-born Papua New Guinean Anglican bishop. He was the first Archbishop of the Anglican Church of Papua New Guinea.

Childhood and education
Hand was born a British subject in 1918 in Clermont, Queensland, Australia, where his English father, the Reverend William Thomas Hand, was the rector of Clermont. He had two older brothers, Peter and Eustace, both of whom also became priests. When he was four, the family returned to England, with his father taking up a country parish in Tatterford, Norfolk. Hand grew up there and was educated at Gresham's School, Holt, where he was an organ scholar, from 1932 to 1937,  and then at Oriel College, Oxford, from 1938 to 1941, where he received a BA degree in history. An Anglo-Catholic, he then trained for ordination into the Church of England at Cuddesdon, from 1941 to 1942.

Career
Ordained a deacon in 1942, Hand became a curate at Heckmondwike in Yorkshire in the north of England and was ordained a priest in 1943. He stayed at Heckmondwike until 1946, when he decided to move to Papua New Guinea, inspired by the life and death of the Reverend Vivian Redlich, a missionary killed there by the Japanese during the Second World War.

Hand arrived in Papua New Guinea in 1946 and spent sixty of his eighty-seven years there. When was consecrated bishop (to serve as coadjutor bishop of New Guinea) on 29 June 1950 at Ss Peter and Paul Cathedral, Dogura, he was the youngest bishop in the Anglican Communion, aged 32.

Known as Percy to friends, Hand never married, remaining a celibate missionary in the tradition of the Oxford Movement, like Trevor Huddleston. He was usually seen as an eccentric, whose usual outfit consisted of a loose shirt, shorts, "sensible shoes" and a wooden cross. He told an Australian journalist in 1972 that "The secret of life in the tropics is Johnson's Baby Powder, lots of it." He could dress more grandly for solemn occasions. During a visit to Papua New Guinea, Prince Philip, Duke of Edinburgh took him for a Roman Catholic bishop. Hand said that he was "Church of England", but Philip asked: "Are you sure?"

Hand was one of the few bishops of the modern world who had walked through equatorial jungle and climbed mountains to find people who had never before had contact with the outside world. In pursuit of publicity to gain support for his diocese, he employed a press officer, Susan Young, who smoked cheroots and flew a plane.

Independence
When Papua New Guinea became independent in September 1975 (British and German New Guinea both having been administered by Australia from 1905 and 1914 respectively), Hand was the first European to apply for citizenship. In 1977 he became the first Archbishop of the Anglican Church of Papua New Guinea. He received several honours, including a knighthood from Queen Elizabeth, the highest rank (Grand Companion) in Papua New Guinea's Order of the Logohu and the title of Chief of the Orokaiva people.

Hand ended his time as archbishop in 1983 at the retirement age of 65 and was succeeded by George Ambo. He then spent two years as the parish priest of his childhood village of Tatterford in Norfolk, where he was still remembered. However, he missed Papua New Guinea and returned, settling in Port Moresby where he wrote his memoirs (and a newspaper column) and headed the local censorship board. When he died in Port Moresby in 2006, he was buried at the Cathedral of the Resurrection, Popondetta. His funeral was delayed, as his coffin was found to be too big for his grave.

Ministry positions
Ordained deacon 1942
Curate at Heckmondwike in Yorkshire 1942–1946
Priest 1943
Missioner, Diocese of New Guinea 1946–1950
Priest-in-charge, Sefoa 1947–1948
Priest-in-charge, Sangara 1948–1950
Archdeacon of North New Guinea 1950–1965
Bishop Coadjutor of New Guinea 1950–1963
Bishop of New Guinea 1963–1975
Bishop of Papua New Guinea 1975–1977
Bishop of Port Moresby 1977–1983
Archbishop of Papua New Guinea 1977–1983
Priest-in-charge, East with West Rudham, Houghton next Harpley, Syderstone, Tatterford and Tattersett 1983–1985

Honours

Commander of the Order of the British Empire, 1975
Knight Commander of the Order of the British Empire, 1984
Grand Companion of the Order of the Logohu, 2005
Chief of the Orokaiva people of Oro Province

Autobiography
Modawa: Papua New Guinea and Me 1946–2002, by Archbishop David Hand (Salpress, Port Moresby, 2002)

Notes

External links
Obituary in 'The Guardian' newspaper of London
Obituary at Church of Papua New Guinea web site
The Niugini Liturgy prepared and published by David Hand

1918 births
2006 deaths
People from North Norfolk (district)
People from Queensland
People educated at Gresham's School
Alumni of Oriel College, Oxford
Alumni of Ripon College Cuddesdon
Australian Anglo-Catholics
Papua New Guinean Anglicans
Knights Commander of the Order of the British Empire
Grand Companions of the Order of Logohu
Anglican missionaries in Papua New Guinea
Anglican bishops of New Guinea
20th-century Anglican bishops in Oceania
20th-century Anglican archbishops
Anglican archbishops of Papua New Guinea
Australian classical organists
Male classical organists
Australian expatriates in Papua New Guinea
20th-century classical musicians
20th-century Australian musicians
Anglo-Catholic bishops
Anglo-Catholic missionaries
Australian Anglican missionaries
20th-century organists
20th-century Australian male musicians
Anglican bishops of Port Moresby